The S.I.L.V.E.R. series is a fantasy novel series by Tanith Lee.  The Silver Metal Lover, published in 1981, is the first in the series. Metallic Love, published in 2005, is the second novel.

The Silver Metal Lover

Plot summary
Robots have replaced human labor on earth, causing massive unemployment in a world devastated by pollution and natural disasters. Then Electronic Metals releases a new line: performing artists and sexual companions designed to entertain human partners. Jane, a rich, lonely, and insecure 16-year-old, meets one, the minstrel Silver, and falls passionately in love, despite revulsion at the idea of preferring a mechanical man to a human. She gives up everything she has known for him, and discovers herself. Silver becomes more and more "human" in loving her—a clever illusion created by his programming. Or is it? This unstable society can't afford any evidence that some robots might be indistinguishable from humans. Tragedy is inevitable.

Adaptations
A graphic novel of the Silver Metal Lover, adapted by Trina Robbins, was published by Crown Books in 1985 but later went out of print. A successful Kickstarter campaign to reprint the book was completed in early 2018 by the IDW imprint It's Alive!. The new edition will feature a variant cover and afterword by Colleen Doran, a foreword by Gail Simone, an essay by Tanith Lee's husband John Kaiine, and a new introduction by Trina Robbins.

Singer Julia Ecklar, in her album Divine Intervention (released in 1986), recorded a song titled "Silver" which is based on Lee's novel. The song is from Silver's point of view about Jane's feelings for him, basically being a tune about an impossible love. Just as in The Silver Metal Lover, there are hints about Silver also caring for Jane (although the song also implies that Silver is not capable of love). Ecklar plays off of the uncertain relationship between the two characters: the melody is soft and romantic despite its conflicting lyrics.

Metallic Love

Plot summary
As an orphan growing up in the slums, Loren read her clandestine copy of Jane's Story over and over, relishing every word. But Loren is no Jane. Savvy and street-smart, Loren could never be stirred by a man of metal, her passion never ignited by an almost-human - even one designed for pleasure.

Still, when the META corporation does the unthinkable and brings back updated versions of robots past-Loren knows she must see Silver. And just like Jane, it is love at first sight. But Silver is now Verlis. If he was perfection before, he is now like a god. Yet he is more human than his creators think - or fear. While Loren doesn't quite trust him, she will follow her twice-born lover into a battle to control his own destiny - one that will reveal to her the most astonishing illusion of all.

Series
Tanith Lee expressed interest in writing a third novel in the series, titled The Tin Man, which would return to the story of Silver and Jane. However, Lee died in 2015 and the status of this potential story at the time of her death remains unknown.

References

External links
 SciFi.com Article on the S.I.L.V.E.R. series
 Tanith Lee on the Silver Metal Lover

Series by Tanith Lee
Fantasy novel series
1981 British novels
2005 British novels
Novels by Tanith Lee
British fantasy novels
DAW Books books